Agdistis kruegeri is a moth in the family Pterophoridae. It is known from South Africa (Northern Cape, Western Cape, Eastern Cape, KwaZulu-Natal).

The wingspan is 18–22 mm. The forewings are grey with hardly visible dark dots, found in the discal area, at the costal margin, in middle part and at the wing base. The hindwings are uniformly grey. Adults are on wing from October to November.

Etymology
The species is named after Dr Martin Krüger (Transvaal Museum, Pretoria).

References

Endemic moths of South Africa
Agdistinae
Moths of Africa
Moths described in 2009